The 2012 King's Cup is an international football tournament that was held in Thailand from 15 to 21 January 2012. The 4 national teams involved in the tournament were required to register a squad of 25 players. Only players in these squads were eligible to take part in the tournament.

Squads

Denmark League XI
Head coach: Morten Olsen

Norway 
Head coach: Egil Olsen

South Korea U-23 
Head coach: Hong Myung-bo

Thailand
Head coach:  Winfried Schäfer

References

External links
 King's Cup
 Football in Thailand

2012 in Thai football cups
King's Cup